Manzano High School is a public high school located in northeast Albuquerque, New Mexico. It is part of the Albuquerque Public Schools system. The current principal is Rachel Vigil.

History 
While still sophomores, Manzano's first senior class attended classes at Sandia High School (1959–1960), sharing the facility. The next school year (1960–1961), the Manzano students, now juniors, along with the new sophomore class, started the year at Sandia, and, when the new school was ready, moved into Manzano High on December 19, 1960. Seniors who lived in the new Manzano boundaries that year remained at Sandia, regardless of which district they lived in, so the new school opened with only sophomores and juniors attending. The first senior class was graduated on June 6, 1962. The school has now been in operation at its original location for over sixty years.

Athletics

MHS competes in the New Mexico Activities Association (NMAA), as a class 6A school in District 2. In 2014, NMAA realigned the state's schools into six classifications and adjusted district boundaries. In addition to Manzano High School, the schools in District 2-6A include Sandia High School, La Cueva High School, Eldorado High School, and Highland High School.

In 1988, Manzano High School hosted the National Association of Student Councils National Conference which was led in effort by Activities Director/Student Council Adviser Libby Tilley, who served as executive director of the New Mexico Association of Student Councils for roughly 18 years from 1993 to 2011.

In March 2006, the Monarch varsity boys' basketball team defeated Alamogordo to win the Class 5A championship. It was Manzano's first state title in boys' basketball since 1974.

On December 2, 2017, Manzano defeated their cross-town rival La Cueva High School to complete an undefeated season (13-0) and win the New Mexico Class 6-A football championship under head coach Chad Adcox.

Notable alumni
 Janelle Anyanonu, member of the New Mexico House of Representatives
 Kent Cravens, businessman and former member of the New Mexico Senate
Holly Holm (2000), professional mixed martial arts fighter; former Women's UFC bantamweight division champion
 Lynne Russell, former CNN reporter
 Billy Smith, former MLB player (California Angels, Baltimore Orioles, San Francisco Giants)

References

External links
 http://www.nmact.org/
 Manzano High School homepage
 Albuquerque Public Schools website

High schools in Albuquerque, New Mexico
Public high schools in New Mexico